Oscar Enrique Salazar (born June 27, 1978) is a former Major League Baseball infielder. He previously played in Major League Baseball for the Detroit Tigers, Baltimore Orioles and San Diego Padres. He also played in Nippon Professional Baseball for the Yokohama DeNA BayStars.

Playing career
Signed by Oakland as an amateur free agent in 1994, Salazar was selected off waivers by the Detroit Tigers in 2002, and made his major league debut for the Tigers on April 10, 2002 against the Chicago White Sox. He appeared a pinch runner in the seventh inning and remained in the game at second base during the Tigers' 7–5 loss.

In one season as a backup with the Tigers, Salazar batted .190 with one home run and three RBI in eight games.

In 2003, Salazar was diagnosed with injuries in his arm and shoulder which required season-ending surgery. He worked out in 2004 spring training, but his recovery was slower than expected. He played that season for the Akron Aeros, the Cleveland Indians' Double-A affiliate, batting .221 with six home runs and 21 RBI in 44 games.

In 2005, Salazar played for Cancún of the Mexican League, appearing in 71 games and batting .273 with six home runs and 32 RBI. He played for his hometown team, the Tigres de Aragua the Caribbean Series, after he plays on his actual team, Tiburones de La Guaira.

Baltimore Orioles
On November 24, 2006, Salazar signed with the Baltimore Orioles as a minor league free agent. He played for the Bowie Baysox of the Double-A Eastern League in 2007. In 136 games with the Baysox, he hit .290 with 22 home runs and 96 RBI. He began 2008 with the Triple-A Norfolk Tides of the International League, batting .311 with seven home runs, 23 doubles and 44 RBI in 63 games before his June recall.

On June 10, 2008, Salazar was called up to the Orioles to replace struggling starter Steve Trachsel on the roster. He batted .284 with five home runs and 15 RBI in 34 games with the Orioles in 2008.

San Diego Padres
On July 19, 2009, Salazar was traded to the San Diego Padres for relief pitcher Cla Meredith. On February 1, 2011, the Padres designated Salazar for assignment. He was released by the Padres on March 28, 2011.

Florida Marlins
On April 14, 2011, Salazar signed a minor league contract with the Florida Marlins. He spent the season with the Triple-A New Orleans Zephyrs, batting .221 with two home runs and 16 RBI in 45 games.

Yokohama DeNA BayStars
On February 12, 2012, Salazar passed a try out for a Japanese team, Yokohama DeNA BayStars and signed a contract. In 66 games with Yokohama, Salazar hit .265 with seven home runs and 32 RBI. He was released by the BayStars on October 16, 2012.

Guerreros de Oaxaca
On March 23, 2013, Salazar signed with the Guerreros de Oaxaca of the Mexican Baseball League.

Pericos de Puebla
On April 14, 2013, Salazar was traded to the Pericos de Puebla. He was released on April 24, 2013.

Coaching career

On March 30, 2021, Salazar was named fielding coach for the El Paso Chihuahuas.

See also
 List of Major League Baseball players from Venezuela

References

External links

Oscar Salazar at Pura Pelota (Venezuelan Professional Baseball League)

1978 births
Living people
Akron Aeros players
Arkansas Travelers players
Arizona League Athletics players
Baltimore Orioles players
Binghamton Mets players
Bowie Baysox players
Bravos de Margarita players
Caribes de Anzoátegui players
Detroit Tigers players
Erie SeaWolves players
Guerreros de Oaxaca players
Lake Elsinore Storm players
Langosteros de Cancún players
Major League Baseball infielders
Major League Baseball players from Venezuela
Mexican League baseball first basemen
Mexican League baseball left fielders
Mexican League baseball right fielders
Mexican League baseball third basemen
Midland RockHounds players
Minor league baseball coaches
Modesto A's players
New Orleans Zephyrs players
Nippon Professional Baseball infielders
Norfolk Tides players
Pastora de los Llanos players
Sportspeople from Maracay
Pericos de Puebla players
Sacramento River Cats players
Salt Lake Stingers players
San Diego Padres players
Southern Oregon Timberjacks players
T & A San Marino players
Tiburones de La Guaira players
American expatriate baseball players in Venezuela
Tigres de Aragua players
Toledo Mud Hens players
Venezuelan baseball coaches
Venezuelan expatriate baseball players in Japan
Venezuelan expatriate baseball players in Mexico
Venezuelan expatriate baseball players in the United States
Venezuelan expatriate baseball players in San Marino
Wichita Wranglers players
Yokohama DeNA BayStars players